Quinten Hermans (born 29 July 1995) is a Belgian road and cyclo-cross cyclist, who currently rides for UCI WorldTeam .

In 2015 he won the European under-23 cyclo-cross championships. He also won the bronze medal in the men's under-23 event at the 2016 UCI Cyclo-cross World Championships in Heusden-Zolder.

Major results

Road

2018
 1st Stage 4 Oberösterreich Rundfahrt
 2nd Overall Tour de Wallonie
1st  Points classification
1st  Young rider classification
1st Stage 4
 3rd Internationale Wielertrofee Jong Maar Moedig
 8th Overall Tour of Belgium
2019
 1st  Overall Flèche du Sud
1st  Points classification
1st Prologue, Stages 1 & 2
 3rd Dwars door het Hageland
 7th Overall Tour de Wallonie
2021
 6th Overall Tour de Wallonie
2022
 2nd Liège–Bastogne–Liège
 3rd Overall Tour of Belgium
1st Stage 4
 3rd BEMER Cyclassics
 6th Ronde van Limburg
 8th Overall Arctic Race of Norway
 9th Route Adélie

Grand Tour general classification results timeline

Cyclo-cross

2011–2012
 1st Junior Leudelange
 2nd Junior Antwerpen
 3rd National Junior Championships
2012–2013
 UCI Junior World Cup
2nd Tábor
2nd Plzeň
2nd Koksijde
 2nd Overall Junior Superprestige
2nd Ruddervoorde
2nd Zonhoven
2nd Hamme
2nd Gavere
2nd Gieten
3rd Diegem
 Junior Bpost Bank Trophy
2nd Ronse
3rd Baal
 2nd National Junior Championships
 2nd Junior Kalmthout
2013–2014
 Under-23 Superprestige
3rd Zonhoven
 3rd Pétange
 3rd Financne
2014–2015
 National Trophy Series
2nd Southampton
 UCI Under-23 World Cup
3rd Koksijde
 3rd Under-23 Middelkerke
 3rd Under-23 Essen
 3rd National Under-23 Championships
2015–2016
 1st  UEC European Under-23 Championships
 2nd Overall UCI Under-23 World Cup
1st Hoogerheide
2nd Lignières-en-Berry
3rd Namur
 1st Overall Under-23 Bpost Bank Trophy
1st Koppenberg
1st Essen
1st Antwerpen
1st Baal
2nd Loenhout
 2nd Overall Under-23 Superprestige
1st Diegem
2nd Gieten
2nd Zonhoven
2nd Ruddervoorde
2nd Gavere
2nd Middelkerke
3rd Hoogstraten
3rd Spa-Francorchamps
 2nd Under-23 Sluitingsprijs
 3rd  UCI World Under-23 Championships
 3rd National Under-23 Championships
2016–2017
 1st  UEC European Under-23 Championships
 1st  National Under-23 Championships
 2nd Overall UCI Under-23 World Cup
2nd Namur
3rd Zeven
3rd Rome
3rd Hoogerheide
 1st Overall Under-23 Superprestige
1st Zonhoven
1st Ruddervoorde
1st Diegem
1st Spa-Francorchamps
2nd Gieten
2nd Gavere
2nd Middelkerke
3rd Hoogstraten
 1st Overall Under-23 DVV Trophy
1st Hamme
1st Antwerpen
1st Lille
2nd Essen
3rd Baal
 2nd Under-23 Overijse
 2nd Under-23 Oostmalle
 3rd Waterloo
2017–2018
 EKZ CrossTour
1st Meilen
 Soudal Classics
2nd Neerpelt
3rd Sint-Niklaas
 2nd Iowa City
 UCI World Cup
3rd Iowa City
 Brico Cross
3rd Kruibeke
3rd Bredene
 3rd Pétange
2018–2019
 1st Waterloo
 EKZ CrossTour
2nd Hittnau
2nd Eschenbach
3rd Meilen
 Brico Cross
2nd Bredene
3rd Meulebeke
 Soudal Classics
2nd Sint-Niklaas
 3rd La Meziere
2019–2020
 Ethias Cross
1st Beringen
1st Essen
3rd Eeklo
3rd Kruibeke
 Superprestige
2nd Gieten
2nd Boom
 Rectavit Series
2nd Neerpelt
2nd Sint-Niklaas
 DVV Trophy
2nd Lille
 UCI World Cup
3rd Heusden-Zolder
 3rd Wachtebeke
2020–2021
 Ethias Cross
1st Eeklo
2nd Essen
 X²O Badkamers Trophy
2nd Brussels
 2nd Oostmalle
2021–2022
 UCI World Cup
1st Fayetteville
3rd Waterloo
3rd Tábor
 2nd  UEC European Championships
 Superprestige
2nd Gieten
2nd Ruddervoorde
2nd Merksplas
3rd Niel
 3rd National Championships
 3rd Gullegem
2022–2023
 1st Ardooie
 2nd Woerden

References

External links
 

1995 births
Living people
Cyclo-cross cyclists
Belgian male cyclists
Place of birth missing (living people)
Sportspeople from Namur (city)
Cyclists from Namur (province)